Mario Farrugia (born 10 March 1955 in Malta) was a professional footballer, during his career he played for Żurrieq, where he played as a defender.

Farrugia made six appearances for the Malta national football team during the UEFA Euro 1984 qualifying rounds.

References

Living people
1955 births
Maltese footballers
Malta international footballers
Żurrieq F.C. players

Association football defenders